Metro Gold, also known as 9 Gold, was a Hindi-language terrestrial television channel in India. The channel was a joint venture of both DD Metro and Nine Gold of Kerry Packer and Vinay Maloo of HFCL - Nine Broadcasting India; hence known as Metro Gold. During its first launch, the channel was more likely known as DD Metro channel's "primetime block" from 7 pm to 10 pm IST, where it showed its programmes only in the given three-hour span on DD Metro Channel. But when the programmes started becoming popular in the primetime slot, DD Metro tried to set up some realistic terms with Nine Gold, which created disagreement between the companies and led up the channel's closing.

Metro Gold's programming was targeted at family audiences, and covered genres including drama, comedy, horror, and live events. Among its most successful programmes are Mamla Gadbad Hai, Saamne Wali Khidki, Tede Medhe Sapnay, and Chonch Ladi Re Chonch.

After Metro Gold went off-air, it signed a contract with STAR Plus and sold off all of their shows to the channel. STAR Plus bought Nine Gold's entire library of programmes after signing the deal, and all of the programmes were re-aired on STAR Plus from the beginning. Besides, all of Metro Gold's programmes now belong to (are claimed by) STAR Plus and known as theirs rather than DD Metro's, though they were aired on DD Metro channel. The reason was that HFCL - Nine Gold paid DD Metro 1.21 million rupees for the three hours of air-time on DD Metro and they had full claim and the right to sell their programmes to anyone, and when they signed a deal with STAR Plus, DD Metro had no say in it.

Programmes
The following is a list of programmes that were broadcast by Metro Gold Channel at the time it was on-air (now the programmes belong to STAR Plus channel):

 Alag Alag
 Blockbuster
 Bol Baby Bol
 Chonch Ladi Re Chonch
 Eena Meena Deeka
 Greed
 The Helen Show
 Hare Kanch Ki Chodian
 Hum Bhi To Hain Tumhare
 Hum Hain Kal Aaj Aur Kal
 Hum Tum Ek Camre Mei Band Hon
 Jaaneman Jaaneman
 Jannat
 Kabhii Sautan Kabhii Sahelii
 Kavita
 Khaaki
 Kuch Ret Kuch Paani
 Maan
 Madhuri Magic
 Mamla Gadbad Hai
 Meri Mrs. Chanchala
 Mini Superstars
 Mooch Nahi Toh Kuch Nahi
 Mr. Mehmaan
 Nargis
 Patang
 Piyaa Binaa
 Yehi Hai Right Price
 Saamne Wali Khidki
 Shaadi No. 1
 Smriti
 Superstars
 Tedhe Medhe Sapnay
 Zindagi Milke Bitayenge

References

External links
 DD Metro 9 Gold Golden Hours Serials online
 Metro Gold list of shows
 News article on Times of India
 Metro Gold Shows news article

Doordarshan
Defunct television channels in India
Television channels and stations established in 2000
Television channels and stations disestablished in 2003